The Decauville railway of La Guerche-sur-l'Aubois was a horse-drawn narrow-gauge railway, which operated around 1910 at the Daumy, Boucheron & Cie lime and cement factory in La Guerche-sur-l'Aubois.

History 
One of the founders of the company has originally been producing hydraulic lime, a building material that hardens both in the air and under water. His factory, Daumy Ainé et Cie, was initially, around 1869, located in Beffes near Jouet,  to the north.

Route 
Old postcards and the stationery used by Daumy, Boucheron & Cie around 1910 show all the means of transport they used. The lime was taken by the  gauage Decauville railway from the quarries below the church, to the limekilns, slaking ponds and grinding mills, and finally to the shipping points for the finished products on the railway and the Berry Canal.

References 

Tram transport in France
600 mm gauge railways
La Guerche-sur-l'Aubois